Victor Gram (30 January 1910 – 12 February 1969) was a Danish politician who was a member of the Social Democrats. He was the minister of defence between 1962 and 1968 and a long-term member of the Parliament (1943–1969).

Biography
Gram was born in Højby on 30 January 1910. At age 16 he became a member of the Social Democratic Youth of Denmark which he headed between 1942 and 1946. Then he joined the Social Democrats and served at the Parliament from 3 April 1943 to 12 February 1969. On 15 November 1962 Gram was appointed minister of defense. He remained in the post until 2 February 1968. The cabinets were headed by Prime Minister Jens Otto Krag.

Gram died in Copenhagen on 12 February 1969 and buried in Fredericia.

References

External links

1910 births
1969 deaths
Members of the Folketing
Danish Defence Ministers
Social Democrats (Denmark) politicians
People from Odsherred Municipality